Velma McBride Murry is an American psychologist and sociologist, currently the Lois Autrey Betts Chair in Education and Human Development and Joe B. Wyatt Distinguished University Professor at Vanderbilt University.

Early life and education 
McBride Murry was raised in Medon, Tennessee. McBride Murry attended the University of Tennessee for her undergraduate studies, where she received a Bachelor's degree in 1974. Following her undergraduate studies, she worked with elementary school teachers and students in Memphis, Tennessee where she became interested in child psychology and development. She then attended University of Missouri-Columbia, where she received both her Master's degree in 1985 and her Doctorate in 1987.

Career and research 
Following her doctoral research, McBride Murry became an assistant professor at the University of Connecticut within the School of Family Studies and then moved to Athens, Georgia to become an assistant professor at the University of Georgia. There, her research program centered on studies to understand how successful families and communities help children succeed. From 1995 to 2008, she served as co-director of the Center for Family Research with Gene Brody. Together, they co-developed the Strong African American Families program in 2000, which provided educational interventions to reduce adolescent substance abuse and high-risk behaviors in adolescents. The program is intended to promote successful parenting strategies for adults and good decision-making for their children.

In 2008, McBride Murry moved to Vanderbilt University, where she became a professor in the Department of Human and Organizational Development and the Lois Audrey Betts chair in education and human development. There, she developed the Pathways for African American Success program, leveraging technology to create and disseminate interventions for children and their caregivers. The program is designed in part to address HIV infection rates, which are comparatively higher among rural African American communities in the United States, by increasing access to reliable information across these communities.

Awards and honors 

 Elected Member, National Academy of Medicine, 2020
 Presidential Citation, American Psychological Association, 2014
 Elizabeth Hurlock Beckman Award, American Psychological Association, 2013
 Reuben Hill Award, National Council on Family Relations, 2006

References

Year of birth missing (living people)
Living people
Vanderbilt University faculty
American women psychologists
21st-century American psychologists
American women sociologists
American sociologists
University of Tennessee alumni
University of Missouri alumni